The Pacific Building is a historic office building in downtown Portland, Oregon, United States. It has been listed on the National Register of Historic Places since March 5, 1992.

This building was the second of three similarly-Italianate buildings built in Portland by prolific local architect A.E. Doyle's firm. The project's primary designer, Charles K. Greene, worked on the trio of Italianate Doyle-commissioned buildings in Portland: the smaller Bank of California Building (also completed in 1924), the Pacific Building, and the Public Service Building (a skyscraper completed in 1928). A young Pietro Belluschi started his career with A.E. Doyle working on this building, and later in it. Upon its opening in 1926, Doyle moved his firm's headquarters into the Pacific Building.

The lobby of the 10-story building was designed by Belluschi, and connected to Portland's first underground parking garage. The connection to the parking garage was lost in 2000 when the former bus station to the south (which sat on top of the garage) was torn down and replaced by an annex to the nearby Hilton Hotel.  Architecturally, the Pacific Building appears to combine the Chicago School with Italian Renaissance architecture. The red tile roof and dormers combine with geometric windows that are almost flush with the facade to achieve this effect.

The lot upon which the Pacific Building stands is across Yamhill Street from Pioneer Courthouse, in the heart of downtown Portland. The entire lot once was the grounds of the Henry Corbett mansion (built 1875), which remained until construction began on the Pacific Building. Corbett's widow kept a cow on the grounds at one time while a major city grew around it. This juxtapositioning of the old and new earned the lot a nickname: "The Million Dollar Cowpasture".

See also
 Architecture of Portland, Oregon
 National Register of Historic Places listings in Southwest Portland, Oregon

References

External links

 Pacific Building (Emporis)

Skyscraper office buildings in Portland, Oregon
National Register of Historic Places in Portland, Oregon
Pietro Belluschi buildings
A. E. Doyle buildings
Southwest Portland, Oregon
Portland Historic Landmarks
Office buildings completed in 1926